A by-election was held for the New South Wales Legislative Assembly electorate of Hastings and Macleay on 23 September 1898 because Francis Clarke resigned to allow Edmund Barton to re-enter parliament.

Dates

Result

Francis Clarke resigned to allow Edmund Barton to re-enter parliament.

Aftermath
The election campaign of Sydney Smith was assisted by James Young, who was the Free Trade member for the neighbouring district of The Manning and Secretary for Public Works. Justice William Owen was subsequently appointed to conduct a Royal Commission into allegations concerning Young's conduct during the by-election, The major allegation was that the effect of Young's statements was that as Secretary for Public Works he would favour Smith more than Barton in dealing with the requirements of the electorate. Justice Owen found Young had not abused the powers of his office, however rebuked him for a "grave indiscretion" in the way he spoke.

See also
Electoral results for the district of Hastings and Macleay
List of New South Wales state by-elections

References

1898 elections in Australia
New South Wales state by-elections
1890s in New South Wales